Angerville is a commune in the Essonne department in Île-de-France in northern France. Angerville station has rail connections to Orléans, Étampes and Paris.

Inhabitants are known as Angervillois.

References

External links

Official website 

Communes of Essonne
Orléanais